"Blood, Sweat & Tears" is a song by American singer Ava Max, released as a promotional single through Atlantic Records on July 30, 2019, and charted on the Czech Radio Top 100 at number 60. The song was written by Max, Peter Thomas, Sofia Hoops, and the producer Cirkut, with lyrics describing the determination to persevere through a relationship.

Release and reception
"Blood, Sweat & Tears" was released on July 30, 2019, which was accompanied by a lyric video. The song was written by Max, Peter Thomas, Sofia Hoops, and the producer Cirkut. In a statement, Max described the lyrics as "giving all of yourself to someone you love and sticking by their side no matter what". Writing for Time, Raisa Bruner stated that it was "prime singalong material with an instant catchy factor". "Blood, Sweat & Tears" charted on the Czech Radio Top 100 at number 60.

Composition
"Blood, Sweat & Tears" is described by Brittany Spanos of Rolling Stone as a midtempo song with an anthemic chorus. The song's lyrics detail a relationship where each party is giving their all. In the pop hook, Max's vocals grow more urgent as she sings the lyrics, "I'mma give you all my blood, sweat, tears / And when it hurts I'm gonna stay right here". Writing for MTV News, Madeline Roth wrote that the chorus' lyrics detail a "messy relationship", which she compared to William Shakespeare's 1597 tragedy Romeo and Juliet.

Track listing

Credits and personnel
Credits adapted from Apple Music metadata.
 Amanda Ava Kocivocals, songwriting
 Henry Walterproduction, songwriting
 Peter Thomassongwriting
 Sofia Hoopssongwriting

Charts

References

2019 songs
Ava Max songs
Songs written by Ava Max
Songs written by Cirkut (record producer)
Song recordings produced by Cirkut (record producer)